T. G. Venkatesh (born 16 May 1950) is an Indian businessman and politician. He served as a Member of the Legislative Assembly (MLA) in the Legislative Assembly of Andhra Pradesh from 1999 to 2004 and from 2009 to 2014. He was  Minister for Minor Irrigation during the government headed by Nallari Kiran Kumar Reddy. He has been a member of the Rajya Sabha since 2016.He has a son named TG Bharath and a daughter named TG Maurya

Early life
T. G. Venkatesh has been described as being among the richest people living in the Rayalaseema region of Andhra Pradesh state in India. He was born to T. G. Gopal Setty and T. G. Gowramma on 16 May 1950 in Madanapalli, Chittoor district, Andhra Pradesh, and has a BCom degree from Sri Venkateswara University in Adoni. He married T. G. Swarajya Lakshmi Kumari on 22 February 1973. The couple have two daughters and a son named T.G. Bharath who had contested as an MLA in Assembly constituency elections 2019 and lost to Abdul Hafeez Khan of YSRCP.

Business career
After having successfully started a caustic soda factory called Sree  Rayalaseema Alkalies and Allied Chemicals, Venkatesh diversified into manufacturing high-strength calcium hypochlorite, power projects, wind power, manufacturing animal vaccines, large-scale salt producing units, movie theatres and star hotels, spread over Andhra Pradesh, Karnataka and Tamil Nadu.

He was for some time the chairman of the Andhra Pradesh State Trading Corporation.

Political career
Venkatesh stood successfully in the Kurnool constituency as a Telugu Desam Party (TDP) candidate in the 1999 state assembly elections, with V. Rambhupal Chowdary of the Indian National Congress being his nearest rival. In the 2004 elections, standing in the same constituency for the same party, he came second to M. Abdul Gafoor of the Communist Party of India (Marxist). He joined the INC later that year and as a candidate for that party he beat Gafoor in the elections of 2009.

Objecting to the bifurcation of Andhra Pradesh, which would create a separate state of Telangana, Venkatesh switched his support back to the TDP in March 2014, following a path recently taken by several other prominent INC politicians. He again stood in Kurnool as a TDP candidate in 2014, finishing second to S. V. Mohan Reddy of the YSR Congress Party.

He has been a TDP member of the Rajya Sabha representing Andhra Pradesh since June 2016.

In 2013, while Minister for Minor Irrigation, Venkatesh promised to support the Arya Vysya community in Andhra Pradesh, suggesting that they had lost their way politically and that they needed to develop their trading capability.

In September 2017, Venkatesh suggested that Kancha Ilaiah was a traitor and should be hanged. He believed that Ilaiah's book, titled Samajika Smugglurlu Komatollu, should be banned as it incited both religious and caste-based hatred. In 2012, he had courted controversy by suggesting that under-performing members of the Indian Administrative Service (IAS) should be shot, which some people considered to be an incitement to murder. He subsequently claimed that it was a figure of speech and that he would retract it if IAS officers admitted their incompetence.
On 20 June 2019 he joined BJP as TDP has lost in 2019 election.

References

External links
TGV Group homepage

Living people
Indian National Congress politicians from Andhra Pradesh
Members of the Andhra Pradesh Legislative Assembly
Rajya Sabha members from Andhra Pradesh
Telugu Desam Party politicians
Indian industrialists
1950 births
People from Kurnool
Bharatiya Janata Party politicians from Andhra Pradesh